When Men Cheat is a 1950 West German comedy film directed by Carl Boese and starring Grethe Weiser, Kurt Seifert and Jeanette Schultze.

It was made at the Tempelhof Studios in Berlin. The film's sets were designed by the art directors Willi Herrmann and Heinrich Weidemann.

Cast
 Grethe Weiser as Frau Bamberg
 Kurt Seifert as Arthur Bamberg, Seidenfabrikant, ihr Mann
 Jeanette Schultze as Angelika, Studentin u. 'Taxigirl'
 Emil Suhrmann as Paul, Bambergs Freund
 Ida Wüst as Frau Schröder, Zimmervermieterin
 Rudolf Platte as Pauls Diener
 Ruth Lommel
 Alexa von Porembsky
 Ute Sielisch
 Walter Gross
 Fritz Böttger
 Franz-Otto Krüger
 Oscar Sabo
 Ellen Hille

References

Bibliography 
 Bock, Hans-Michael & Bergfelder, Tim. The Concise CineGraph. Encyclopedia of German Cinema. Berghahn Books, 2009.

External links 
 

1950 films
West German films
German comedy films
1950 comedy films
1950s German-language films
Films directed by Carl Boese
Films shot at Tempelhof Studios
Adultery in films
German black-and-white films
1950s German films